

Guinea
Coach: Sékou Somparé

Burkina Faso
Coach:  Roberto Danton

The Gambia
Coach:  Tarik Siagy

Malawi
Coach: John Kaputa

Algeria
Coach: Otmane Ibrir

Cameroon
Coach: Christian Anatole Abée

Niger
Coach: Frederic Acosta

Zimbabwe
Coach: Rodwell Dhlakama

Notes

References

External links
 Official Rosters on Confederation of African Football website 

Squads